Darvin Ebanks (born 30 May 1993) is an American professional soccer player and coach.

Youth and College
Ebanks attended Mount de Sales High School where he was considered a 5-star recruit by Top Drawer Soccer. He attended the University of North Carolina where he helped the Tar Heels earn the 2011 Championship Title.

Club career
Ebanks began his professional career with local NPSL side Georgia Revolution, competing in the Southeast Conference of the South Region. During the 2015 season, the Revolution made it to the Southeast Conference playoffs, ultimately losing out to the Atlanta Silverbacks Reserves.

On March 10, 2016, Ebanks signed with USL side Harrisburg City Islanders. he made his first appearance for the City Islanders on May 19, 2016, as a substitute in the 2016 U.S. Open Cup Second Round against West Chester United. The Islanders won the match 2-0 and advanced to the third round.

Coaching
In 2020, Ebanks joined Women's Premier Soccer League expansion club Savannah Spirit as an assistant coach.

International
Ebanks has participated in the U.S. U-18 National Team training camp in 2011, but has not made any appearances for the team.

Honors

North Carolina Tar Heels
NCAA Division I Men's Soccer Championship: 2011 Champions

References

1993 births
American soccer players
North Carolina Tar Heels men's soccer players
Penn FC players
USL Championship players
Association football defenders
Soccer players from Georgia (U.S. state)
Sportspeople from Macon, Georgia
Living people
National Premier Soccer League players
Georgia Revolution FC players
Major Arena Soccer League players
Harrisburg Heat players
USL League Two players
American soccer coaches
Savannah College of Art and Design alumni